German Abdulaev is a Russian judoka.

Achievements

External links 

20th-century births
Living people
Russian male judoka
Year of birth missing (living people)
Place of birth missing (living people)